Benjamin Tatar (born 18 May 1994) is a Bosnian professional footballer who plays as a forward or midfielder for the Bosnian Premier League club Borac Banja Luka and the Bosnia and Herzegovina national team.

International career
In September 2020, Tatar was called up to represent the Bosnia and Herzegovina national team, for UEFA Euro 2020 qualifying play-offs against Northern Ireland and UEFA Nations League games against Netherlands and Poland. He debuted in a home draw against the Netherlands on 11 October 2020.

Personal life
Tatar's younger brother Kerim is also a professional footballer who plays as a winger for First League of FBiH club Goražde.

Career statistics

International

Honours
Sarajevo
Bosnian Premier League: 2018–19, 2019–20 
Bosnian Cup: 2018–19

Individual
Performance
2. HNL Top Goalscorer: 2016–17 (13 goals)

References

External links

Benjamin Tatar at Sofascore

1994 births
Living people
Footballers from Sarajevo
Association football midfielders
Association football forwards
Bosnia and Herzegovina footballers
Bosnia and Herzegovina international footballers
FK Radnik Hadžići players
NK Novigrad players
HNK Cibalia players
HNK Gorica players
NK Slaven Belupo players
FK Sarajevo players
Abha Club players
Qadsia SC players
Second Football League (Croatia) players
First Football League (Croatia) players
Croatian Football League players
Premier League of Bosnia and Herzegovina players
Saudi Professional League players
Kuwait Premier League players
Bosnia and Herzegovina expatriate footballers
Expatriate footballers in Croatia
Expatriate footballers in Kuwait
Expatriate footballers in Saudi Arabia
Bosnia and Herzegovina expatriate sportspeople in Croatia
Bosnia and Herzegovina expatriate sportspeople in Kuwait
Bosnia and Herzegovina expatriate sportspeople in Saudi Arabia